Maxine P. Atkinson is an American sociologist.  She is Professor of Sociology at North Carolina State University. She is a NC State TH!NK Faculty Fellow.

She graduated from University of Georgia, Georgia State University, and Washington State University.

Works

References 

Living people
Sociologists
Year of birth missing (living people)
University of Georgia alumni